William Riley (23 April 1866 – 4 June 1961) was an English novelist. He was born in Laisterdyke, Bradford. He wrote 39 books using the name W. Riley, mostly fiction and mostly published by Herbert Jenkins Ltd.

After an education at Bradford Grammar School he entered his father's business in textiles, but two years later the firm diversified and William led the innovative new business in the sale of magic lantern slides and equipment. The business was successful until 1914, when, with the onset of World War I, it failed: Riley then developed a second career as a writer, having already published Windyridge.

His first novel Windyridge was written as a series of weekly chapters, in the winter of early 1911, to entertain his wife and two friends, the Bolton sisters, whose parents and third sister had all recently died. He quotes himself as saying "I tell you what I'll do, I'll write a story and read each chapter to you as I go along, week by week. It may help to keep us from brooding". The story is set in the village of Hawksworth near Baildon. He completed the tale in early 1912, having paused in his writing over the summer, and was persuaded to submit it for publication. He agreed to send it to just one publishing house, and chose this by writing on slips of paper the names of three established houses and the novice publisher Herbert Jenkins. It was this last slip which he selected, and Jenkins agreed to publish the book, as his firm's first publication.

In 1919 he moved to Silverdale, Lancashire for the sake of his wife's health, and named his house, 8 Wallings Lane, Windyridge after his novel. The name was removed by subsequent occupiers, but  the house still stands. In his autobiography, Sunset Reflections (1957), he recalls tales of life in Silverdale, where amongst other activities he was chair of the Building Committee for the Gaskell Memorial Hall. The clock on the exterior of Silverdale Methodist Church was presented to the church in 1938 "to the glory of God and to mark [the donor's] appreciation of the wholesome contributions to literature of Mr. W. Riley, a member of this church" (see photo).

The University of Bradford Library's Special Collections department holds an archive of Willie Riley's manuscripts and other papers and a collection of his books. Shortly before his death Riley donated his manuscript of Windyridge to Leeds Central Library. In 2017, a relative of Riley's donated to the Leeds Central Library a complete set of his books. Many of these have personal dedications by the author written inside to members of his family, mainly his first wife, Clara, and second wife, Edith. Riley pasted newspaper reviews inside the books and the collection also contains a number of his unpublished short novels, sermons and book reviews. 

His death was recorded in obituaries in The Times and other local and national newspapers. He was buried in the village graveyard at Silverdale, along with his first wife Clara.

Bibliography
All fiction and published by Herbert Jenkins Ltd. except where otherwise stated.

Windyridge                    	 1912
Netherleigh 	               	 1915	
Way of the Winepress 	       	 1916	
Number Seven Brick Row 	       	 1918	
Olive of Sylcote 	       	 1918	
Through a Yorkshire Window     	 1919	
Jerry and Ben 	               	 1919	
A Yorkshire Suburb 	       	 1920	
The Lady of the Lawn		 1920	
Men of Mawm		         1921	
Rachael Bland's Inheritance	 1922
The Garden of Delight		 1923
Laycock of Lonedale		 1924
Peter Pettinger	                 1925
A Village in Craven 		 1925
Children of the Outcast		 1926
Late Harvest/Lord's Poor Brother 1927	[Plays]
Windyridge Revisited		 1928	
Witch Hazel		         1928
Doctor Dick		         1929	
Squire Goodall		         1930
Kit of Kit's Folly''''		 1931	The Silver Dale		         1932	[Topography]
Old Obbutt		         1933
Yorkshire Pennines        	 1934	[Topography]
Jack and John	   	         1935
The Man of Anathoth	         1936	
Old Asa and other Stories	 1936	(Epworth Press)
The Sixpenny Man		 1937
Gold Chains		         1938
The Valley of Baca		 1939	
The Voice in the Garden		 1940	
Common Clay		         1941
Grapes from Thorns		 1943	
A Stick for God	         1946
Services of Song		 1954	[Religion] (Epworth Press)
Sunset Reflections		 1957	[Autobiography]
In the Silver Dale 	         1958	[Topography] (Dalesman)
The Man and the Mountain	 1961

References

External links
Willie Riley website
 
  Includes full text of Men of Mawm
Images of Riley in the Lancashire Lantern collection.   there are four images: a view of his home "Windyridge"; Riley standing in front of "Windyridge"; two pictures of him in his study.

1866 births
1961 deaths
20th-century English novelists
Writers from Bradford
English male novelists
20th-century English male writers